Mikhail Kizilov (born on 27 June 1974 in Simferopol). He works on the history of Crimea in the Late Middle Ages and Modern Times and on Jews, Khazars and Karaism in Eastern Europe, especially in Crimea, Poland, Ukraine and Lithuania.

Life 
He studied history at the Simferopol State University, Medieval Studies at the Central European University in Budapest and Jewish and Hebrew Studies at the University of Oxford (2004-2007). From 2007, Kizilov holds a DPhil (PhD) in modern history from Oxford University (United Kingdom) with his dissertation The Karaites, a religious and linguistic minority in eastern Galicia (Ukraine) 1772-1945. His doctoral advisor was R. J. W. Evans.

Kizilov was a visiting scholar at the Simon Dubnow Institute in the winter semester from 2002 to 2003. His research interests include Karaite Studies, Jewish history in Eastern Europe, Holocaust, Roma studies, various aspects of Crimean history, Khazars, Krymchaks, Crimean Tatars, Subbotniki (Sabbatarians), the history of slavery in the Ottoman Crimea and Crimean Khanate, Mangup and Chufut-Kale, Roma (Gypsy) community of the Crimea, Karaim language, literature of the Crimean Jews in Turkic languages, and more. 

Between 2000 and 2022 he published six academic and four popular monographs and also over a hundred articles in the English, Russian, German, Polish and Ukrainian languages. Some of his studies were translated into French, Hebrew and  Turkish. In his studies Kizilov uses sources and scholarship in about twenty modern and dead languages, including Slavic, European and Oriental languages.

Awards 
2008, Kreitman Fellow at Ben-Gurion University of the Negev (Beer Sheva, Israel).
2012 Judaica Bibliography Award from the Association of Jewish Libraries for his book Bibliographia Karaitica (2011).
2013-2014 Sosland Fellow of the Mandel Center for Advanced Holocaust Studies at the United States Holocaust Memorial Museum.

Works

Thesis

Books 

 Kizilov, Mikhail (2009). The Karaites of Galicia: An Ethnoreligious Minority Among the Ashkenazim, the Turks, and the Slavs, 1772-1945. Leiden / Boston: Brill, 2009 (=Studia Judaeoslavica. Vol. 1). 461 pp. 
 Kizilov, Mikhail (2015). The Sons of Scripture. The Karaites in Poland and Lithuania in the Twentieth Century. Warsaw / Berlin: De Gruyter, 2015. 

 Кизилов, Михаил, Никифорова, Людмила. Айн Рэнд. Москва: Молодая Гвардия, 2020 (=ЖЗЛ. Т. 2013).
 Kizilov, Mikhail. La Judée Criméenne. Histoire du Judaїsme en Crimée. Translated from Russian by Jean-Claude Fritsch. Simferopol: Dolia, 2016.

Articles 

 Kizilov, Mikhail. “Karaite Pies and Samurai Swords: The Karaite Theme in David Shrayer-Petrov’s Life, Fiction, and Memoirs.” Kwartalnik Historii Żydów / Jewish History Quarterly 3 (2021): 857-876.
 Kizilov, Mikhail. “It Was the Poles that Gave Me Most Pain”: Polish Slaves and Captives in the Crimea, 1475–1774.” In Slavery in the Black Sea Region, c. 900–1900. Forms of Unfreedom at the Intersection between Christianity and Islam. Edited by Felicia Roşu. Leiden–Boston, 2022, 145-186.
 Kizilov, Mikhail. “Re-reading Rand through a Russian Lens.” Journal of Ayn Rand Studies 21:1 (2021): 105-110.
 Kizilov, Mikhail. “Polish Slaves and Captives in the Crimea in the Seventeenth Century.” Acta Orientalia Hungaricae 73:2 (2020): 251-265.
 Kizilov, Mikhail. “Crimean Museum Collections as a Source of Information on Jewish History, Religion, Culture, and Everyday Life.” In Moreshet Israel: A Journal for the Study of Judaism, Zionism and Eretz Israel 16 (2018): 67-92.
 Kizilov, Mikhail. “Reports of Dominican Missionaries as a Source of Information about the Slave Trade in the Ottoman and Tatar Crimea in the 1660s.” In Osmanlı Devletinde Kölelik: Ticaret–Esaret–Yaşam / Slavery in the Ottoman Empire: Trade–Captivity–Daily Life.  Edited by Z. G. Yağcı, F. Yaşa. Istanbul: Yeditepe Yayınevi, 2017, 103-116. 
 Kizilov, Mikhail. “Karaites and Communism: The Positive Side of the Relations of the East European Karaites with Bolshevik and Soviet Authorities.” Karaite Archives 4 (2017): 61-75.
 Kizilov, Mikhail. “On Two New Translations of Marcin Broniewski’s Tartariae Descriptio (1595).” Acta Orientalia Academiae Scientiarum Hungaricae 68 (1) (2015): 475-479.
 Kizilov, Mikhail. “National Inventions: The Imperial Emancipation of the Karaites from Jewishness.” In An Empire of Others. Making Ethnographic Knowledge in Imperial Russia and the USSR. Edited by Roland Cvetkovski and Alexis Hofmeister. Budapest–New York: Central European University Press, 2014, 369-394.
 Kizilov, Mikhail. “Jan Grzegorzewski’s Karaite Materials in the Archive of the Polish Academy of Sciences in Kraków.” Karaite Archives 1 (2013): 59-83.
 Kizilov, Mikhail. “Russian Treasures.” In Treasures of Merton College. Edited by Steven Gunn. London: Third Millenium, 2013, 110-111.
 Kizilov, Mikhail. “Between Europe and the Holy Land. East European Jews as Intermediaries between Europe and the Near East from the 16th through the 17th Centuries.” In La frontière méditerranéenne du XVe au XVIIe siècle. Edited by Albrecht Fuess and Bernard Heyberger. Brepols, 2013, 301-318.
 Kizilov, Mikhail. “Scholar, Zionist, and Man of Letters: Reuven Fahn (1878–1939/1944) in the Karaite Community of Halicz (Notes on the Development of Jewish Ethnography, Epigraphy and Hebrew Literature).” Kwartalnik Historii Żydów / Jewish History Quarterly 4 (2012): 470-489.
 Kizilov, Mikhail. “Noord en Oost Tartarye by Nicolaes Witsen. The First Chrestomathy on the Crimean Khanate and its Sources.” In The Crimean Khanate between East and West (15th-18th Century) (=Forschungen zur osteuropäischen Geschichte 78). Edited by Denise Klein. Wiesbaden: Harrassowitz 2012, 169-187.

References 

Alumni of the University of Oxford
Living people

1974 births